Lee A. Solomon (born August 17, 1954) is an Associate Justice of the Supreme Court of New Jersey.  He was nominated by Governor Chris Christie to serve on May 21, 2014 and confirmed by the New Jersey Senate and sworn in on June 19, 2014.

Biography
Solomon was born in Philadelphia in 1954 and graduated from Central High School. He is a 1975 graduate of Muhlenberg College where he became a member of Phi Kappa Tau fraternity and graduated in 1978 from Widener University School of Law. Before his Supreme Court tenure, he had been an elected Republican politician serving as councilman from the borough of Haddon Heights, a Camden County Freeholder, and a member of the New Jersey General Assembly from the 6th Legislative District from 1992 until 1996. In 1992, he was an unsuccessful candidate for Congress running against Rob Andrews in the 1st congressional district. He has also served as Camden County prosecutor and as a Deputy U.S. Attorney for the New Jersey District during the time Christie was the U.S. Attorney for the district.

In 2006, Solomon was appointed by Governor Richard Codey to be a judge in the Superior Court from Camden County, first in the Family Division, later the Criminal Division. He had been president of the New Jersey Board of Public Utilities (BPU) from February 23, 2010 until December 2011. At the end of his BPU term, he rejoined the Superior Court in the Civil Division and later an assignment judge. Solomon was nominated to the Supreme Court in 2014 by Christie as a part of a deal with Senate Democrats to fill two vacant seats on the court. He was confirmed by the Senate in a 36 to 2 vote. On April 26, 2021, Governor Phil Murphy nominated Solomon for tenure in 2021, and the Senate confirmed him for tenure on June 3, 2021 by a vote of 37-0. Solomon's mandatory retirement date is August 17, 2024.

Solomon and his wife Dianne live in Haddonfield, New Jersey. His wife has been a member of the BPU since June 2013 and had served as president of the board in 2014.

References

|-

|-

1954 births
Living people
New Jersey lawyers
Justices of the Supreme Court of New Jersey
New Jersey city council members
County commissioners in New Jersey
Republican Party members of the New Jersey General Assembly
Muhlenberg College alumni
Widener University alumni
People from Haddon Heights, New Jersey
People from Haddonfield, New Jersey
Politicians from Camden County, New Jersey
Politicians from Philadelphia
21st-century American judges